"Who Cares?" and "Gone Daddy Gone" are songs performed by Gnarls Barkley and are featured on their debut album, St. Elsewhere. The songs were released on November 6, 2006 as a double A-sided single from that album in the United Kingdom (see 2006 in British music). A week later, on November 13, 2006, the single debuted at No. 60 in the UK Singles Chart. "Gone Daddy Gone" is a cover of the Violent Femmes song. The song peaked at No. 26 on Billboard's Modern Rock Tracks chart, and at No. 35 on Billboard's Adult Top 40 chart. The song "Gone Daddy Gone" is also featured in the soundtrack for the video game Tony Hawk's Project 8, the soundtrack for Forza Motorsport 2 and in the trailer for the Chris Rock film I Think I Love My Wife.

Track listing 
 UK CD1
 "Who Cares?" (Longer Version) – 3:00
 "Gone Daddy Gone" – 2:28

 UK CD2
 "Who Cares?" – 2:14
 "Gone Daddy Gone" (Live From Later With Jools Holland) – 2:40
 "Who Cares?" (Video) – 3:00
 "Gone Daddy Gone" (Video) – 2:36

Music videos 
On September 29, 2006, the music video for "Gone Daddy Gone" premiered on MTV, MTV2 and Much Music. Directed by Chris Milk, the video features vocalist Cee-Lo, producer Danger Mouse, and the orchestra as fleas who spot a lovely young woman and chase her, getting slaughtered one by one. A video was also made for "Who Cares?", featuring Mario Van Peebles as a bored Blacula unsuccessfully hitting the bars for a victim, doing routine errands, and finally attacking a young man and watching TV with him. Gnarls Barkley's MySpace account featured screencaps of the video as the background to premiere with the video. The video has also premiered on MySpace's music video section.

Charts

References 

2006 singles
Gnarls Barkley songs
Music videos directed by Chris Milk
Song recordings produced by Danger Mouse (musician)
Songs written by Willie Dixon
Songs written by CeeLo Green
Songs written by Danger Mouse (musician)
2006 songs
Warner Music Group singles